Cryptomphalina is a fungal genus in the family Polyporaceae. It is a monotypic genus, containing the single species Cryptomphalina sulcata, discovered in Thailand. French botanist Roger Heim circumscribed Cryptomphalina in 1966.

References

External links
Cryptomphalina at Index Fungorum

Fungi of Asia
Polyporaceae
Monotypic Polyporales genera
Taxa described in 1966